There are over 20,000 Grade II* listed buildings in England. This page is a list of these buildings in the city of Norwich in the county of Norfolk.

Buildings

Notes

External links

Norwich
 
 
Norwich-related lists